Carbon Health is an American chain of primary healthcare clinics that also provides telemedicine. It was founded in 2015 in San Francisco.

History

Carbon Health was founded in San Francisco in 2015 by Udemy co-founder Eren Bali, engineer Tom Berry, and physician Greg Burell. It began as a software platform and mobile app for medical records, telehealth, doctor-patient messaging, and scheduling. The team developed the platform by opening a private clinic that saw about 750 patients; at the time, their goal was to build software for medical practices.

In 2017, Eren Bali was introduced to Caesar Djavaherian, an Iranian-American emergency medicine doctor and owner of Direct Urgent Care, a national chain of urgent care clinics. Djavaherian had experienced problems with electronic health record (EHR) systems, and he decided to pilot the Carbon Health software in his clinics. In 2018, Carbon Health and Direct Urgent Care merged, and Caesar Djavaherian became the company's fourth co-founder. Because of this merge, Carbon Health now owned 7 brick-and-mortar clinics in the San Francisco Bay Area.

In 2017, Carbon Health had created a mobile app to communicate with directly with doctors, and an alternative to traditional EHR systems.

In 2019, Carbon Health announced a Series B round of $30 million, followed by a Series B extension of $28M in early 2020 to strengthen its initiatives related to the COVID-19 pandemic. Later in 2020, the company announced a $100M round led by Dragoneer Investment Group, and in 2021, a $350M round led by The Blackstone Group.

By April 2021, Carbon Health had 49 physical location medical clinics, including 19 clinics in the San Francisco Bay Area and 8 clinics in Los Angeles. By October 2021, Carbon Health had 90 full service medical clinics, located in 14 states within the United States.

In July 2022, Carbon Health laid off 25% of its workforce. That was approximately 250 employees.

COVID-19

In March 2020, Carbon Health partnered with the San Francisco-based online pharmacy Alto Pharmacy to provide oral swab home test kits to patients in California. The tests were reportedly distributed under an Emergency Use Authorization by the United States Food and Drug Administration (FDA); however, that same week, the FDA suspended the sales and distribution of home testing kits produced by Carbon Health, among others.

In April 2020, Carbon Health released an open source, HIPAA-compliant repository of COVID-19 clinical data.

In January 2021, the city of Los Angeles began using Carbon Health software to manage the logistics of administering 1.5 million COVID-19 vaccines at mass vaccination sites including Dodger Stadium.

References

Health care companies established in 2015
Technology companies based in the San Francisco Bay Area
Health care companies based in California